French Songs and Arias is an album released by New Zealand opera diva Kiri Te Kanawa in 1997.

Track listing
"Phidyle" - Duparc
"L'Invitation Au Voyage" - Duparc
"La Vie Antérieure" - Duparc
"Le Manoir De Rosamonde" - Duparc
"Testament" - Duparc
"Au Pays Ou Se Fait La Guerre" - Duparc
"Chanson Triste" - Duparc
"Asie" - Ravel
"La Flûte Enchantée" - Ravel
"L'Indifférent" - Ravel
"Depuis Le Jour" - Charpentier
"L'Année En Vain Chasse L'Année" - Debussy
"D'Amour L'Ardente Flamme" - Berlioz

References

Kiri Te Kanawa albums
1997 classical albums